2 cents may refer to 2 subunits of currencies where the subunit is called a cent; several currencies have coins of this value.

Coins
 Australian two-cent coin
 2 cent euro coin
 New Zealand two-cent coin
 Two-cent piece (United States)

Other uses
 My two cents, an American idiom
 2Cents, a metal/punk band
 My Two Cents, a fictional news show hosted by Kent Brockman on the American cartoon TV show The Simpsons
 Lesson of the widow's mite, a Biblical story that describes a gift of roughly two cents